Khaberni (in Arabicخبرني) is a private news agency that publishes an online newspaper. The name of the agency in Arabic translates to "Tell me".

In a market study carried out by Ipsos in March 2012 it was established that Khaberni' was among the top 20 most visited websites in the country along with two other news portals, namely Saraya and Ammon News''.

References

External links
 Official website

2008 establishments in Jordan
Arabic-language websites
Middle Eastern news websites
Jordanian news websites
Mass media in Amman
Newspapers established in 2008
Asian news websites